Polykarp Leyser IV (4 September 1690 in Wunstorf – 7 April 1728 in Helmstedt) was a German Lutheran theologian, philosopher, physician, lawyer and historian. He was the son of Polykarp Leyser III, the great-grandson of Polykarp Leyser II and the great-great grandson of Polykarp Leyser the Elder, all also theologians.

External links
DNB entry
ADB entry
 

1690 births
1728 deaths
German Lutheran theologians
German philosophers
18th-century German physicians
18th-century German lawyers
18th-century German historians
German male non-fiction writers
People from Wunstorf